In Greek mythology, Otus was a hero from Cyllene, Elis. He participated in the Trojan War with Meges, commander of the Epeians. He was killed by Polydamas.

Note

References 

 Homer, The Iliad with an English Translation by A.T. Murray, Ph.D. in two volumes. Cambridge, MA., Harvard University Press; London, William Heinemann, Ltd. 1924. . Online version at the Perseus Digital Library.
 Homer, Homeri Opera in five volumes. Oxford, Oxford University Press. 1920. . Greek text available at the Perseus Digital Library.

Elean mythology
Ancient Eleans
Achaeans (Homer)